is a prefecture of Japan located in the Kantō region of Honshu. Ibaraki Prefecture borders Fukushima Prefecture to the north, Tochigi Prefecture to the northwest, Saitama Prefecture to the southwest, Chiba Prefecture to the south, and the Pacific Ocean to the east.

Mito, the capital, is the largest city in Ibaraki Prefecture. Other major cities include Tsukuba, Hitachi, and Hitachinaka. Ibaraki Prefecture is located on Japan's eastern Pacific coast to the northeast of Tokyo, and is part of the Greater Tokyo Area, the most populous metropolitan area in the world. Ibaraki Prefecture features Lake Kasumigaura, the second-largest lake in Japan; the Tone River, Japan's second-longest river and largest drainage basin; and Mount Tsukuba, one of the most famous mountains in Japan. Ibaraki Prefecture is also home to Kairaku-en, one of the Three Great Gardens of Japan, and is an important center for the martial art of Aikido.

History

Ibaraki Prefecture was previously known as Hitachi Province. In 1871, the name of the province became Ibaraki, and in 1875 it became its current size, by annexing some districts belonging to the extinct Shimōsa Province.

Paleolithic
In Japanese Paleolithic, humans are believed to have started living in the present-day prefecture area before and after the deposition of the volcanic ash layer from the Aira Caldera about 24,000 years ago. At the bottom of this layer are local tools of polished stone and burnt pebbles.

Asuka Period
During the Asuka period the provinces of Hitachi and Fusa were created. Later Fusa was divided, among them, the Shimōsa Province.

Muromachi Period
At the beginning of the Muromachi period, in the 14th century, Kitabatake Chikafusa made of the Oda Castle his field headquarters for over a year, and wrote the Jinnō Shōtōki (Chronicles of the Authentic Lineages of the Divine Emperors), while he was at castle.

Edo Period
During the Edo period, one of the three houses or clans originating from Tokugawa Ieyasu (Gosanke 御 三家, three houses), settled in the Mito Domain, the clan is known as the Mito Tokugawa family or simply the Mito clan. Mito Domain, was a Japanese domain of the Edo-period Hitachi Province.

In 1657, a Mitogaku was created when Tokugawa Mitsukuni, head of the Mito Domain, commissioned the compilation of the Dai Nihonshi, a book on the history of Japan.

Meiji Period
In Meiji era, during the Meiji Restoration, the political map changes, the old provinces are converted or merged, to create the current prefectures, in this case the Ibaraki Prefecture.

Geography

Ibaraki Prefecture is the northeastern part of the Kantō region, stretching between Tochigi Prefecture and the Pacific Ocean and bounded on the north and south by Fukushima Prefecture and Chiba Prefecture. It also has a border on the southwest with Saitama Prefecture. The northernmost part of the prefecture is mountainous, but most of the prefecture is a flat plain with many lakes and is part of Kantō Plain.

Natural Parks
, 15% of the total land area of the prefecture was designated as Natural Parks, namely Suigo-Tsukuba Quasi-National Park, and nine Prefectural Natural Parks. Also, Ibaraki has one Prefectural Geopark. The Suigo-Tsukuba Quasi-National Park, also includes the northeast area of Chiba Prefecture.

Mountains
The northern third of the prefecture is mountainous and in the center is the Tsukuba Mountains (筑波 山地). Its main mountains are: mount Yamizo with an elevation of 1022 m on the border with Fukushima and Tochigi prefectures (tripoint), mount Takasasa with 922 m, mount Tsukuba with two peaks Nyotai-San at 877 m and Nantai-San at 871 m, mount Osho at 804 m, mount Hanazono at 798 m, and mount Kaba at 709 m.

Water system
The main rivers that flow through the prefecture include the Tone, Naka (Ibaraki), and Kuji rivers, all of which flow into the Pacific Ocean. Before the seventeenth century, the lower reaches of the Tone were different from its current layout, and the Tone ran south and emptied into Tokyo Bay, and tributaries such as the Watarase and Kinu rivers had independent water systems.

The main tributaries of the Tone River basin are the Kinu River and Kokai River, which flow from north to south in the western part of the prefecture. The Shintone and Sakura rivers flow into Lake Nishiura.

The Edo River flows into Tokyo Bay; its source currently rises as an arm of the Tone River. In the past, the course of the Edo River was different, its source was corrected and diverted to the Tone River in the 17th century by the Tokugawa shogunate to protect the city of Edo (now Tokyo) from flooding.

The Tone River, in addition to the Edo River, is part of the southern border of Ibaraki Prefecture with Chiba Prefecture, and the Watarase River, Tone River, Gongendō River, and Naka River (Saitama) in the southwestern border of Ibaraki with Saitama Prefecture. The Watarase River has become a small boundary of the southern border between Ibaraki and Tochigi prefectures.

From ancient times to the beginning of the Edo period, the lower reaches of the Tone River did not exist and the mouth of the Tone was in Tokyo Bay. On the plain was the Katori Sea, which existed in ancient times, the Lake Kasumigaura and other lagoons in present-day Chiba prefecture are remnants of that sea. Katori Sea was connected to the Kashima-nada (Pacific Ocean).

Lake Kasumigaura is currently divided into three lakes: Nishiura, Kitaura, Sotonasakaura. In addition, in the prefecture there are freshwater lagoons such as Hinuma, Senba, and Ushiku.

Fukuoka Dam, is a dam that spans the Kokai River in Tsukubamirai, it is one of the three largest dams in the Kantō region. Ryūjin Dam in Hitachiōta, is a beautiful dam on the Ryūjin River with a large pedestrian suspension bridge above the dam lake.

Cities

Thirty-two (32) cities are located in Ibaraki Prefecture:

Mito (capital city of the prefecture)
Bandō
Chikusei
Hitachi
Hitachinaka
Hitachiōmiya
Hitachiōta
Hokota
Inashiki
Ishioka
Itako
Jōsō
Kamisu
Kasama
Kashima
Kasumigaura
Kitaibaraki
Koga
Moriya
Naka
Namegata
Omitama
Ryūgasaki
Sakuragawa
Shimotsuma
Takahagi
Toride
Tsuchiura
Tsukuba
Tsukubamirai
Ushiku
Yūki

Towns and villages

These are the towns and villages in each district, 10 towns and 2 villages in 7 districts:

Higashiibaraki District
Ibaraki
Ōarai
Shirosato
Inashiki District
Ami
Kawachi
Miho

Kitasōma District
Tone
Kuji District
Daigo
Naka District
Tōkai

Sashima District
Goka
Sakai
Yūki District
Yachiyo

Mergers

Economy 
Ibaraki's economy is based on energy production (particularly nuclear energy), chemical and precision machining industries, research institutes, and tourism.  Agriculture, fishing, and livestock are also important sectors in the prefecture.

Ibaraki's vast flat terrain make it highly suitable for industrial development. This complements its proximity to the Tokyo metropolitan area, giving it a high reputation as an industrial base. The prefecture is also home to Tsukuba, Japan's most extensive research and academic city, and the birthplace of Hitachi, Ltd.

Agriculture 
With extensive flat lands, abundant water, and suitable climate, Ibaraki is among the prefectures with the highest agricultural production in Japan. It plays an important role in supplying food to the Tokyo metropolitan area. Its main products include melons, pears, peppers, various varieties of rice and sugar cane, as well as flowers and ornamental plants.

It also supplies other food crops to the rest of the country. As of March 2011, the prefecture produced 25% of Japan's bell peppers and Chinese cabbage.

Fishing
It is one of the prefectures with the highest fish production in the country; in the Pacific Ocean, Lake Kasumigaura, other lagoons and rivers, various species of fish are obtained.

Cattle
The Hitachigyū cattle (常 陸 牛 - ひたちぎゅう - Hitachi-gyū, Hitachi-ushi), which is a prefectural bovine breed, is noteworthy in livestock. The name comes from the kanji 常 陸 (Hitachi), the name of the ancient Hitachi Province and 牛 (ushi or gyū, beef).

Background. In 1833 Tokugawa Nariaki (徳川 斉昭) established the breeding of black cattle in the present Migawa-chō (見川 町) of the city of Mito. Originally it remained mainly in the northern part of the prefecture, but later it spread throughout the prefecture.

Industrial centers
 Hitachi area. Grouping of industries, such as electrical, electronic and machinery. More than 1,300 companies; many of them hired by the Hitachi company, which was founded in Sukegawa (Hitachi City) in 1910.
 Tōkai area. Atomic Energy Research Organization Grouping. J-PARC, Proton Accelerator Research Complex.
 Tsukuba area. 32 institutes for education and research. Manipulation of matter at the level of atoms (nanotechnology). Robotic security center for support in daily life. Space center.
 Kashima area. Grouping of materials industries, such as steel and petrochemicals, around 160 companies.

Demographics

Ibaraki's population is decreasing more rapidly than any other prefecture.

Culture
Ibaraki is known for nattō, or fermented soybeans, in Mito, watermelons in Kyōwa (recently merged into Chikusei), and chestnuts in the Nishiibaraki region.

Ibaraki is famous for the martial art of Aikido founded by Morihei Ueshiba, also known as Osensei. Ueshiba spent the latter part of his life in the town of Iwama, now part of Kasama, and the Aiki Shrine and dojo he created still remain.

Kasama is famous for Shinto (Kasama Inari Shrine), Ibaraki Ceramic Art Museum, house museum of the calligrapher and ceramist Kitaōji Rosanjin, Kasama Nichidō Museum of Art, residence of Morihei Ueshiba, founder of the martial art Aikidō.

The capital Mito is home to Kairakuen, one of Japan's three most celebrated gardens, and famous for its over 3,000 Japanese plum trees of over 100 varieties.

Kashima Shrine (Jingū) Ibaraki's cultural heritage.

Mito Tōshō-gū, is the memorial shrine of Tokugawa Ieyasu in Mito.

Seizansō was the retirement villa of Tokugawa Mitsukuni.

Mito Municipal Botanical Park, is a botanical garden in Mito.

Park Ibaraki Nature Museum in Bandō.

There are castle ruins in many cities, including Mito Castle, Yūki Castle, Kasama Castle, Tsuchiura Castle, Oda Castle.

Hitachi Fūryūmono, a puppet float theater festival, Intangible Cultural Heritage of Humanity.

Makabe Hina Doll Festival - Hinamatsuri - (Sakuragawa City).

Yūki-tsumugi (silk weaving technique) Intangible Cultural Heritage of Humanity, Kasama ware, Makabe Stone Lamp, Kagami Crystal Glass Factory, old glass factory in Ryūgasaki City.

Education

University
Ami 
Ibaraki Prefectural University of Health Sciences
Hitachi
Ibaraki Christian University

Mito
Ibaraki University
Tokiwa University
Ryūgasaki
Ryūtsū Keizai University
Toride
Tokyo University of the Arts
Tsuchiura
Tsukuba International University
Tsukuba
Tsukuba University
Tsukuba Gakuin University
Tsukuba University of Technology

Sports 
The sports teams listed below are based in Ibaraki.

Football (soccer)
 Kashima Antlers (Kashima)
 Mito HollyHock (Mito)
 Tsukuba FC (Tsukuba)

Volleyball
 Hitachi Rivale (Women's) (Hitachinaka)

Rugby
 Stags - Kashima Rugby Football Club RFC (Kashima)

American football
 Tsukuba University (Tsukuba)

Baseball
 Ibaraki Astro Planets (Yūki) (Baseball Challenge League)
 Ibaraki Golden Golds (Regional club) (Tsukuba)

Wrestling
 Hitachi Pro Wrestling (Regional group) (Hitachi)

Basketball
 Ibaraki Robots (Mito)

Motorsport
 Tsukuba Circuit  (Shimotsuma)

Tourism

 Kairaku-en (garden)
 Mount Tsukuba
 Lake Kasumigaura
 Kashima Shrine
 Ibaraki Prefectural Museum of History
 Tsukuba Science City
 Ushiku Daibutsu
 Ōarai Aquarium
 Fukuroda Falls

Transportation and access

Railways
East Japan Railway Company
Jōban Line
Utsunomiya Line (Tōhoku Main Line)
Mito Line
Suigun Line
Kashima Line
Metropolitan Intercity Railway Company
Tsukuba Express
Kantō Railway
Jōsō Line
Ryūgasaki Line
Kashima Rinkai Railway
Ōarai Kashima Line
Kashima Rinkō Line
Hitachinaka Seaside Railway
Minato Line
Mooka Railway
Mooka Line

Cable cars
Tsukuba Kankō Railway 
Mount Tsukuba Cable Car
Mount Tsukuba Ropeway

Roads

Expressways
  Jōban Expressway
  Ken-Ō Expressway
  Kita-Kantō Expressway
  Higashi-Kantō Expressway

National highways
 Ibaraki Prefecture with the following national routes:
 National Route 4 (around Koga area)
 National Route 6 (Nihonbashi of Tokyo-Toride-Tsuchiura-Mito-Hitachi-Iwaki-Sendai)
 National Route 50
 National Route 51 (Mito-Kashima-Itako-Narita-Chiba)
 National Route 118
 National Route 123
 National Route 124
 National Route 125 (Katori-Tsuchiura-Tsukuba-Koga-Gyōda-Kumagaya)
 National Route 245
 National Route 293
 National Route 294
 National Route 349
 National Route 354
 National Route 355
 National Route 400 (Mito-Nakagawa-Nikko-Minamiaizu-Nishiaizu
 National Route 408
 National Route 461

Prefectural routes 
 Ibaraki Prefecture with more than 300 prefectural routes.

Ports
Port of Ibaraki
Port of Hitachi
Port of Hitachinaka
Port of Ōarai - Ferry route to Tomakomai, Muroran of Hokkaidō

Port of Kashima

Airports
Ibaraki Airport
Ryūgasaki Airfield
Tsukuba Heliport
Ōtone Airstrip  is an airfield located on the Tone River in Kawachi.

Pronunciation
The prefecture is often alternatively pronounced "Ibaragi by those who speak the regional dialect known as Ibaraki-ben. However, the standard pronunciation is "Ibaraki.  According to the author of "Not Ibaragi, Ibaraki, this is most likely due to a mishearing of the softening of the "k" sound in Ibaraki dialect.

Sister regions
Ibaraki is twinned with:
  Essonne, France

See also 
2005 Ibaraki gubernatorial election

Notes

References
 Nussbaum, Louis-Frédéric and Käthe Roth. (2005). Japan Encyclopedia. Cambridge: Harvard University Press. . .

External links

Ibaraki Prefecture Official Website 
Ibaraki Prefecture Official Website 

 
Kantō region
Prefectures of Japan